The Villa Deportiva Nacional (National Sports Village) is, together with the Estadio Nacional del Perú (National Stadium of Peru), one of the main sports venues in Peru. It is in the District of San Luis, in the city of Lima. It is also called VIDENA, for the first two letters of each word in its name.

The offices of the football, athletics, cycling, gymnastics, softball, baseball and wrestling federations. The training centers of the Peruvian national soccer, athletics and baseball are also based here. The Peruvian Olympic Committee has its main offices on this site.

References

External links

Sports venues in Lima
Venues of the 2019 Pan and Parapan American Games
Peru